Taklah Quz (also Romanized as Taklah Qūz and Takaleh Qūz; also known as Taklak Qūz and Taklek Qūz) is a village in Gholaman Rural District, Raz and Jargalan District, Bojnord County, North Khorasan Province, Iran. At the 2006 census, its population was 859, in 204 families.

References 

Populated places in Bojnord County